William O'Sullivan may refer to:

William S. O'Sullivan (1928–1971), Irish-American loanshark and mob enforcer
William O'Sullivan (politician), Irish Cumann na nGaedheal politician
William Henry O'Sullivan (1829–1887), Irish Home Rule League politician
Billy O'Sullivan (born 1968), Irish hurler
Billy O'Sullivan (footballer) (born 1959), English former footballer

See also

William Sullivan (disambiguation)